Mario Leitner (born 2 February 1997) is an Austrian slalom canoeist who has competed at the international level since 2012.

He won a bronze medal in extreme K1 at the 2021 World Championships in Bratislava. He also won a silver medal in the same event at the 2022 European Championships in Liptovský Mikuláš.

Leitner finished 13th in the K1 event at the 2016 Summer Olympics in Rio de Janeiro.

Leitner was introduced to canoeing by his father at age three, and joined a club aged five. In 2014 he won the Austrian Youth Sports Award after winning a gold medal at the junior world championships. He was the first male Austrian canoeist to win that title. His older sister Lisa also competes in canoe slalom.

World Cup individual podiums

References

External links

Mario LEITNER at CanoeSlalom.net

1997 births
Living people
Austrian male canoeists
Olympic canoeists of Austria
Canoeists at the 2016 Summer Olympics
Medalists at the ICF Canoe Slalom World Championships
People from Sankt Veit an der Glan
Sportspeople from Carinthia (state)